Sankt Marienkirchen an der Polsenz is a municipality in the district of Eferding in the Austrian state of Upper Austria.

Population

References

Cities and towns in Eferding District